WLXI (channel 43) is a television station licensed to Greensboro, North Carolina, United States, owned and operated by and broadcasting Tri-State Christian Television (TCT). WLXI shares a transmitter on Terrells Mountain near Chapel Hill with WUNC-TV and co-owned WRAY-TV; the signal reaches Greensboro as well as Raleigh and Durham. Programs are fed to the transmitter from the TCT studio center in Marion, Illinois; WLXI maintained studios on Patterson Street in Greensboro until TCT ended local operations nationally in June 2018.

WLXI went on the air in 1984 and originally aired music videos. This lasted for under 18 months until converting to religious programming.

History
UHF channel 61 was first assigned to Greensboro in the 1960s, but no application was made for it until 1979, when Consolidated Broadcasting Corporation filed with the Federal Communications Commission (FCC), to build it. It originally proposed a low-power facility operating on the former tower of WFMY-TV. Consolidated's principals included Eugene Johnston, a Greensboro attorney, and two lawyers from Winston-Salem. The FCC granted the construction permit on July 28, 1981, but before going on air, Johnston exited most of his share in the business as a result of having been elected to Congress in 1980. At that time, it was hoped that WLXI would be in service by midyear from a tower used by WQMG and studios that a decade earlier had housed WUBC (channel 48), a short-lived UHF outlet.

However, it would be another two years, as Consolidated opted instead to build studios near Kernersville. By February 1983, Consolidated had decided instead to format the station as an all-music video outlet. Under this format, WLXI began broadcasting on March 5, 1984, with an airstaff of local video jockeys (VJs); the first program manager left within a week of signing on. Despite difficulties attracting advertisers to the format and turnover of the entire initial staff (including on-air and sales employees), ownership claimed to have found stable footing by November. A stunt in which the station played "This is the Life" by "Weird Al" Yankovic for 18 straight hours attracted national press attention.

This was not enough to save the station's format as Billy Satterfield of Winston-Salem took over ownership. On July 1, VJ Todd Yohn walked off the job after playing "Take This Job and Shove It" by Johnny Paycheck after hearing rumors that WLXI had been sold; these rumors suggested a religious broadcaster would be channel 61's new operator. Another VJ resigned the next day, with Jay Johnson telling viewers he was leaving "because I feel like the station won't exist very much longer". WLXI experienced no further staff changes for the rest of July, but on August 1, another VJ and a receptionist were fired by Satterfield. VJ Erin Spencer told the News & Record that Satterfield said to her, "You shouldn't be doing this. It's the devil's work. Think of those 7- and 8-year-olds who are watching and being influenced. Video music is the work of the devil."

The next day, Satterfield confirmed the station would switch to Christian programming in a gradual manner and that he had met with executives of the Trinity Broadcasting Network (TBN). TBN then bought WLXI from Satterfield for $300,000 and a $1.4 million loan to cover station debts. The full conversion to TBN programming took place in September 1985 ahead of the network closing on the sale in February.

In 1989, TBN put WLXI and KNAT-TV in Albuquerque, New Mexico, up for sale; one possible reason was that cable systems in the area had dropped WLXI in 1986 for not having a measurable audience. Two years later, it sold WLXI to Tri-State Christian Television of Marion, Illinois, for $1.9 million, giving TCT its first station in the South. In April 2007, TCT pulled TBN programming from its stations in favor of programming supplied by the company.

From 1993 to 2009, WLXI's signal was relayed on low-power translator station W18BG (channel 18, now WMDV-LD) in Danville, Virginia. In June 2009, that station was sold to the Star News Corporation (owners of WGSR-LD in that market) and stopped rebroadcasting WLXI's programming.

At the end of June 2018, TCT closed WLXI's local studio and ended its local programming with the FCC's repeal of the Main Studio Rule, and the station from then on would be programmed through TCT's default national schedule.

Technical information

Subchannel

WLXI is broadcast as one subchannel on the shared multiplex, as is co-owned WRAY-TV. The two broadcast the same programming but are assigned into separate media markets by virtue of their city of license.

Analog-to-digital conversion
WLXI shut down its analog signal on June 12, 2009, as part of the FCC-mandated transition to digital television for full-power stations. The station then adopted channel 43 as its virtual channel instead of 61.

References

External links

Television channels and stations established in 1984
1984 establishments in North Carolina
LXI
Tri-State Christian Television affiliates